Filamin B, beta (FLNB), also known as Filamin B, beta (truncated actin binding protein 278 homolog), is a cytoplasmic protein which in humans is encoded by the FLNB gene.

FLNB regulates intracellular communication and signalling by cross-linking the protein actin to allow direct communication between the cell membrane and cytoskeletal network, to control and guide proper skeletal development.

Mutations in the FLNB gene are involved in several lethal bone dysplasias, including boomerang dysplasia and atelosteogenesis type I.

Interactions
FLNB has been shown to interact with GP1BA, Filamin, FBLIM1, PSEN1, CD29 and PSEN2.

See also
 Larsen syndrome

References

External links
 GeneReview/NIH/UW entry on FLNB-Related Disorders

Further reading